Tactical Response Group may refer to:
 Tactical Response Group (Western Australia)
 State Protection Group, police tactical group  in NSW, Australia